"One Day of Your Life" is a song written by Neil Sedaka and Howard Greenfield and performed by Andy Williams.  The song reached #2 on the adult contemporary chart and #77 on the Billboard Hot 100 in 1970.

References

1970 singles
Songs written by Neil Sedaka
Andy Williams songs
Columbia Records singles
Songs with lyrics by Howard Greenfield
Song recordings produced by Dick Glasser
1970 songs